These are the list of results that England have played from 1871 to 1879.

The first international in international rugby football history was played between Scotland and England at Raeburn Place, in Edinburgh on 27 March 1871. Scotland prevailed by one goal and try to England's one try . A standard points scoring system was at the time undeveloped .

1871 
Scores and results list England's points tally first.

1872 
Scores and results list England's points tally first.

1873 
Scores and results list England's points tally first.

1874 
Scores and results list England's points tally first.

1875 
Scores and results list England's points tally first.

1876 
Scores and results list England's points tally first.

1877 
Scores and results list England's points tally first.

1878 
Scores and results list England's points tally first.

1879 
Scores and results list England's points tally first.

Year Box

Notes 

1871-1879